Dorothea of Denmark may refer to:
Dorothea of Brandenburg (1430–1495), wife of Christopher III of Denmark and later Christian I of Denmark
Dorothea of Denmark, Duchess of Prussia (1504–1547), daughter of Frederick I of Denmark and first wife Anna of Brandenburg, and wife of Albert, Duke of Prussia
Dorothea of Saxe-Lauenburg (1511–1571), wife of Christian III of Denmark
Dorothea of Denmark, Electress Palatine (1520–1580), daughter of Christian II of Denmark, and wife of Frederick II, Elector Palatine
Dorothea of Denmark, Duchess of Mecklenburg (1528–1575), daughter of Frederick I of Denmark and second wife Sophie of Pomerania, and wife of Christopher, Duke of Mecklenburg-Gadebusch
Dorothea of Denmark, Duchess of Brunswick-Lüneburg (1546–1617), daughter of Christian III of Denmark, and wife of William, Duke of Brunswick-Lüneburg